Thanga Surangam is a 1969 Indian Tamil-language film, directed by T. R. Ramanna and produced by E. V. Rajan. The film stars Sivaji Ganesan, Bharathi and Vennira Aadai Nirmala. It was released on 28 March 1969.

Plot 

While escaping Burma during WWII, Kamakshi (S. Varalakshmi) gives her son Rajan to a priest Arockiyasamy (Javar Seetharaman) to get him to safety. They reunite years later in India when Rajan (Sivaji Ganesan) is a C.B.I officer out to catch a gang that's making counterfeit gold. Scientist Subbaiya (T. S. Muthaiah) was attempting to manufacture actual gold but accidentally created a highly realistic counterfeit. The leader of the gang, Mr. Spy (O. A. K. Thevar) has amassed great wealth with this counterfeit and is holding Subbaiya hostage to create more. Rajan tries to learn more by interrogating Amutha (Bharathi), Subbaiya's daughter. Mr. Spy, aware of Rajan's attempts, sends several spies to get closer to him and derail his investigation. As Rajan grows closer to catching the gang, he learns shocking truths that his Father is MR.Spy Fire shots Exchanged between two And he successfully Arrest MR.SPY And He is given Gold Medal

Cast 
Sivaji Ganesan as Rajan (C.B.I Police)
Bharathi as Amutha
Venniradai Nirmala as Malliga/Laila 
O. A. K. Thevar as Mr. Spy/Kanagasabai
S. Varalakshmi as Kamakshi
Major Sundarrajan as I.G Sundaresh
Javar Seetharaman as Arockiyasamy
T. S. Muthaiah as Subbaiya
R. S. Manohar as Velayutham 
Nagesh as Mani 
 Harikrishnan as Dr. Natesan
 B. V. Radha as Saroja
Karuppu Subbiah as Dancer

Soundtrack 
The music was composed by T. K. Ramamoorthy with lyrics by Kannadasan.

References

External links 
 

1960s Tamil-language films
1969 films
Films directed by T. R. Ramanna
Films scored by T. K. Ramamoorthy